Denktaş is a Turkish surname. Notable people with the surname include:
 
Rauf Denktaş (1924–2012), President of the Turkish Republic of Cyprus
Serdar Denktaş (born 1959), Turkish Cypriot politician and son of Rauf Denktaş

Turkish-language surnames